Achim Zeman (born 1961) in Stuttgart) is a German painter and installation artist. He is a representative of Op-Art and is based on the rules of Concrete Art.

Biography 
Zeman studied at the Berlin University of the Arts from 1983 to 1989 and was awarded „Master scholar“ (Meisterschüler) by Professor Kuno Gonschior. Inspired by him, Zeman discovered the artistic configuration of rooms with the means of painting as an area of his artistic work. In 1990 he received a scholarship from the „Kunststiftung Baden-Württemberg“, in the following year a working scholarship from the City state of Berlin. Zeman is a member of the „Westdeutscher Künstlerbund“. Since 1992 he lives and works in Cologne, Germany.

Artistic work

Panel paintings 
Zeman works with basic geometric shapes such as lines, circles and squares. These can be found not only in his spatial installations, but also in his panel paintings. He does not apply the color on canvases, but to acrylic glass sheets, which he additionally processes and grinds with lacquers:: "This creates color surfaces that overlap, changing their effect depending on the incidence of light and the location of the viewer" (in German So entstehen Farbflächen, die sich überlappen, je nach Lichteinfall und Standort des Betrachters ihre Wirkung verändern.) Here, many elements of Zeman's working method can be found in a condensed form: the use of geometric forms, repetition as the structuring rhythm of the works, layering, omissions and shifts that create complex image surfaces that have an effect on the viewer.

The spatial installations 
The core elements of Zeman's work can also be found in the room installations: there is a basic module that refers to the room and usually consists of a geometric form. This is repeated rhythmically and structures the room. He always lets the underlying space shine through by not covering the whole room but allowing for omissions in the conception of his spatial designs. For the scene-setting at his installation "Fluten" at the Kunstmuseum Heidenheim an der Brenz, which is located in the rooms of a former swimming hall with arcade arches, Zeman flocked the floor and walls of the room with wave-shaped blue elements. Here, too, he continues to let the wall itself shine through, transforming it from a closed surface into a translucent space, a diaphanous structure.

Zeman sees himself primarily as a painter who uses painting to alienate and position rooms. In developing the productions, for example, he always takes into account the spatial conditions, such as the exposure to light, which changes the colors. He also consciously works with the subtractive color mixing, which changes the colors in the perception of the visitors on location. In the installation "Grünstreifen" (2007) at the Neuer Kölner Kunstverein, for example, yellow stripes suddenly appear optically between the red and green horizontal foil strips, even though they were not glued on.

Before creating the concept for an installation, Zeman repeatedly visits the place of the event, takes photos, measures the room and informs himself about the respective history of the room. After the first test drawings he prepares the final version on the computer. Depending on the material he uses for his interior design, adhesive plastic film slides are produced, which are later placed in the rooms in laborious detail work.

This is not only a temporal, but also a physical strain: For the work "Fly High" (2015) at the Kunstverein Oerlingshauen, whose exhibition space is located in an old synagogue, he designed the dome of the house with his installation and had to work constantly with his head on his back. n some installations, such as "Sehfest" (2008) in the Rheinisches Landesmuseum Bonn, he spent days applying the colored and fluorescent Foil parts that put a lot of burden on the eye. How exactly Zeman plans ahead is also visible in his work at the Portikus in Bochum (2010), a former public urinal at the Herner Straße in Bochum, which is now a public art-space . There he glued about 4500 foil parts according to an exact construction plan.

In most of his spatial works, Zeman also includes the respective history of a room, its earlier use or its position in a city in his concepts. For the mural in "Weststraße 3" in Radevormwald, for example, he designed his work based on the slate look of the city: „First I looked at what colours predominate here: green, white, grey. Then it was quickly clear that I wanted to get the wall moving.“ (In German: Zunächst habe ich geschaut, welche Farben hier vorherrschen: grün, weiß, grau. Dann stand schnell fest, dass ich die Wand in Bewegung bringen möchte.) „In Motion“ is the name of the work, in which he was able to freely design 60 square metres of space that was permanently preserved as a work of art in public space.

Zeman repeatedly worked at the Villa Zanders in Bergisch-Gladbach: "Zeiträume" (2000), "Horizonte" (2006) and "Nah und Fern" (also 2006) were the titles of these spatial productions. In these exhibitions he not only used geometric forms, but also representations based on binary code. In „Zeiträume“ (Periods) a barcode arranged in several lines - consisting of dots and bars based on the binary code - became part of a revolving wall scenery. The representation reproduced a coded text on the subject of time.

For „Horizonte“ he developed an installation entitled "Zerstreut" (Scattered). As the basic module of his work, he took up the existing parquet flooring on the first floor of the villa (the spatial beginning of the exhibition) and designed blue foil elements, analogous to a parquet rod, with which he covers the floor.

For the Eis- und Schwimmstadion Köln Zeman painted the ice surface with so-called track pictures of ice dancing moves, circular movements in different colors. The installation was called „Circulation“. These pictures are graphic representations of the figures at ice dancing, which indicate to the performers how the dances are to be skated. Zeman painted the colours on the ice surface, which were then covered with further layers of frozen water.

The flooding and swirling 
Zeman measures the spaces of his installations in order to be able to plan his works concretely so that he can create a distorted perspective, an expansion or contraction in the respective space, which, together with the selection of the material - adhesive film, paint or the electromagnetically applied flocking] - can affect all the senses of the observer. For the exhibition „Durch und Durch“ (2003) at the Ludwig Forum for International Art in Aachen, for example, he chose the rectangle that fits the dimensions of the room as the basic module, but at the same time inscribed this in the mathematical room constants in such a way that the desired spatial distortions could occur. His room installations often spread over the entire room, not only embracing the wall or the floors, but continue everywhere, creating the impression of a real flood or flow in the room.

Zeman often refers either indirectly or directly to the element water. Many of his spatial concepts take place in former water-related spaces, such as at the Portikus in Bochum (a public toilet), at the Kunstumseum Heidenheim, which originally was used as a swimming hall, or during the installation at Kunstbad Keitum in 2005. For the 2004 art installation in the former „Watertoren“ (Water Tower) of the city of Vlissingen, he worked with diagonally attached stripes in different light and dark shades of blue: „This makes it look as if some stripes are farther away than others. The observer is put off balance.“ (In German: Dadurch sieht es so aus, als seien einige der Streifen weiter entfernt als andere. Dem Betrachter wird das Gleichgewicht genommen.)

Effect of the room installations 
The artist is fascinated by the possibility of conveying an awareness of the processes of perception to the visitor through the respective arrangement of artistic means. In almost all of his spatial installations, the visitor is always part of the experimental setting and is prevented from gaining an overview. Thus, the viewer no longer faces a work hanging on the wall as a separate unit, but becomes part of the installation, art becomes a „walk-in picture“ through one' s own physicalness. For the spatial exhibition „Laylines“ (2013) at the Galerie Lausberg, Zeman has placed various marking lines, so-called Laylines, on floors, ceilings and walls, which merged into a multi-perspective Gesamtkunstwerk (Total work of art). They should draw the visitor into the room and lead him beyond the room. Here, too, the visitor is indirectly already part of the installation. 

Through the rhythmization of the room by means of recurring basic modules, through the mathematically exact calculation of the necessary deviations from the right angle, so that an installation can unfold a suction effect for the viewer, and through the precisely predetermined color design, it is possible for the artist to address the viewer with all their senses and also to make the three dimensional experience a souls experience. People perceive rooms and the necessary orientation of place through the body, and this perception essentially develops through active movement through a room. By placing the viewer in a „walk-in picture“, making him part of the installation and at the same time rendering the position of an overall view impossible, Zeman places him in an irritation that stimulates reflection on the components of his own perception. On the occasion of the exhibition „Visible“ at the Städtischen Bühnen Münster (2002) a reviewer described the effects of serial repetitions and Zeman's staging as  „that primeval human fear of confrontation with limitless space“ as one of the consequences. 

But the exhibition „Sehfest“ (2008) at the Rheinisches Landesmuseum Bonn proves that this irritation can also be experienced with relish and joy as an extension of one' s everyday perceptions. Here, Zeman pasted the space at his disposal with a multitude of red horizontal and vertical fluorescent film parts, which have a very vitalizing and energizing effect. Gabriele Uelsberg, the museum's director, says: „For to move in a space created by Achim Zeman is like an excursion in a world full of fantasy and rich in experience, in which you can let yourself sink into the colour without stopping, and lose yourself totally in structures and optical illusions.“ (In German:Denn sich in einem gestalteten Raum von Achim Zeman zu bewegen, ist wie ein Ausflug in eine Welt voll Fantasie und Erlebnisfähigkeit, in der man sich haltlos auf Farbe einlassen und maßlos in Strukturen und optischen Illusionen verlieren kann.)

Other installations

Installations on the occasion of international art fairs 
 2009: Rooms of Wonder – Over flow, (Installation on the occasion of the Art Fair in Toronto)  Gladstone Hotel, Toronto, Canada
 2010: Insight on site,(Installation on the occasion of the Art Chicago), Chicago, United States 
 2011 Strud@l, (Installation on the occasion of the Art Toronto) Entrance-Hall of the Metro Toronto Convention Centre, Toronto, Canada 
 2013: Laylines – Passing through,  (Installation on the occasion of the Art Cologne), Cologne, Germany

Installations in public spaces 
 2009: Fully Booked – Hotel Beethoven, Moving Locations e.V., Bonn, Germany
2016: In Motion, Wall painting Westtraße, Radevormwald, Germany
 2016:	Straight Forward, (Work phase from 2012-2016) Concord Park Place, Toronto, Canada

Videography (selection) 
 2016: Straight Forward – Achim Zeman, 01′ 49″ (on the exhibition in Toronto)
 2012: Straight Forward - Achim Zeman, 01′ 15″
 2018: Achim Zeman: Laylines – Passing Through, 00′ 40″

Solo exhibitions 
 1996: Durcheinander, Simultanhalle, Cologne, Germany
 1998 Fluten, Kunstmuseum Heidenheim, Germany
 1998 Drunter und drüber, Wilhelm-Hack-Museum, Ludwigshafen, Germany
1998: Träume – 15 Künstler arbeiten mit Papier, Villa Zanders, Bergisch Gladbach, Germany
 2001: Achim Zeman,  Galerie Witzel, Wiesbaden, Germany
 2005: Schnittstellen, Dortmunder Kunstverein, Dortmund, Germany
 2006: Horizonte, Villa Zanders,  Bergisch Gladbach, Germany
 2008: Sehfest, Rheinisches Landesmuseum Bonn, Bonn, Germany
 2010: Liquid, Neonhalle für zeitgenössische Kunst, Portikus, Bochum, Germany
 2013: Laylines, Galerie Lausberg, Düsseldorf, Germany
 2015: Fly high, Synagoge Oerlinghausen, Oerlingshausen, Germany
 2018: in motion, Galerie Lausberg, Düsseldorf, Germany
 2022: Über Kreuz oder Quer, Brühler Kunstverein, Brühl, Germany

Group exhibitions 
 1991: Calculi, Neuer Berliner Kunstverein, Germany
 1992: Das Diptychon in der neuen Kunst, Museum Folkwang, Essen, Germany
 1998: Träume – 15 Künstler arbeiten mit Papier, Villa Zanders,  Bergisch Gladbach, Germany
 2000: Zeit–Räume – Acht Installationen zum Thema Zeit,  Villa Zanders,  Bergisch Gladbach, Germany
 2003: Farbecht – Echt Farbe, Ludwig Forum für Internationale Kunst, Aachen, Germany
 2004: Blau als Farbe, Galerie Bernd A. Lausberg, Düsseldorf, Germany
 2005: Kunstbad Keitum,  Art Galerie Scheel, Morsum, Sylt, Germany
 2007: Anna Schuster – Achim Zeman: Lichtungen, Neues Kunstforum Köln, Germany
 2008: Gegenstandslos,  Gesellschaft für Kunst und Gestaltung, Bonn, Germany
 2010: Beyond Painting – Lausberg Contemporary, Toronto, Galerie Lausberg, Toronto, Canada
 2010: Landpartie - Eine Übersichtsausstellung des Westdeutschen Künstlerbundes, Kunstmuseum Ahlen, Stadtmuseum Beckum and Museum Abtei Liesborn, Ahlen, Beckum, Liesborn, Germany
 2011: The Ornamental Gesture, Künstlerhaus Dortmund, Dortmund, Germany
2011: Winter Thaw, Galerie Lausberg, Toronto, Canada
 2014: Das Bild einer Stadt, Kunstverein Ellwangen, Germany
 2018: Squares in Motion – Kinetische Kunst aus der Sammlung Marli Hoppe-Ritter, Museum Ritter, Waldenbuch, Germany
 2019: Dots, Points, Circles, Claudia Weil Galerie, Friedberg, Germany
 2021: Pure - Phänomene des Betrachtens (Pure - Phenomena of looking), Galerie Bernd A. Lausberg, Düsseldorf, Germany
 2022: Tough Connections, Neuer Kunstverein Aschaffenburg, Germany

External links 
 Achim Zeman at kunstaspekte.art
 Achim Zeman at artfacts.net

Further reading

References

Concrete art
Op art
Adhesive tape
20th-century German painters
20th-century male artists
21st-century German painters
21st-century male artists
German abstract artists
German contemporary artists
Artists from Stuttgart
1961 births
Living people